"This Time" is a song by Swedish dance music duo Axwell & Ingrosso. The song was released in Sweden on 6 November 2015 as the fifth single from their debut studio album More Than You Know. The song was written by Terrence Thornton, Sebastian Ingrosso, Salem Al Fakir, Axel Hedfors and Vincent Pontare. The song features uncredited vocals from Pusha T. The song also samples the duo's debut track "Something New". The song peaked at number 73 on the Swedish Singles Chart.

In other media
The song is featured on the video game, WWE 2K17.

Track listing

Charts

Weekly charts

Release history

References

2015 songs
2015 singles
Songs written by Axwell
Songs written by Sebastian Ingrosso
Songs written by Vincent Pontare
Songs written by Salem Al Fakir
Axwell & Ingrosso songs
Songs written by Pusha T
Def Jam Recordings singles